Daniël Dupré (20 December 1751 – 4 June 1817) was a Dutch engraver, painter, draftsman, and watercolorist. He was born in Amsterdam and primarily lived and worked there. His paintings and prints depict mostly buildings and landscapes.

Daniël studied under Jurriaan Andriessen at the Stadstekenacademie (City Drawing School). He travelled around Germany and Italy where he visited Düsseldorf, Rome, and Mannheim, before ultimately returning to Amsterdam.

Paintings

References 

1751 births
1817 deaths
18th-century Dutch painters
18th-century Dutch male artists
19th-century Dutch painters
Dutch male painters
Painters from Amsterdam
19th-century Dutch male artists